Holme Fen is a  biological Site of Special Scientific Interest near Holme in Cambridgeshire. It is also a National Nature Reserve and a Nature Conservation Review site, Grade I. It is part of the Great Fen project, which aims to create a 3,700 wetland wildlife area including Holme Fen, Woodwalton Fen and other areas. It is home to a variety of birds, including the Eurasian siskin, Nightingale and Lesser redpoll, and around 450 species of fungi.

Home Fen is described by Natural England as the finest example of birch woodland in lowland Britain. Part of it was a mere which was drained in the nineteenth century, and some relict wetland plants survive such as saw sedge and fen wood-rush. Two new lakes have been excavated.

History 
In October 2015, archaeological work to recover a WW2 Spitfire, flown by Pilot Officer Harold Penketh, that crashed into Holme Fen on 22 November 1940, was undertaken.
Led by Oxford Archaeology East's project director Stephen Macauley, the teams located and recovered artefacts from the crash. A film of the excavation was shown at the Great Fen's Countryside Centre, Ramsey Heights on 27 September, 2019.

Access
The reserve is open to the public throughout the year. Several footpaths cross the site.

Management
Holme Fen is at the south-western edge of the former Whittlesey Mere, which has been drained. The Great Fen Project aims to reconnect Holme Fen with nearby Woodwalton Fen, another vestigial fragment of wild fenland. Holme approximately marks the south-western limit of Stage 2 of the Great Fen Project.

References

Sites of Special Scientific Interest in Cambridgeshire
Nature Conservation Review sites
National nature reserves in England